Royal Marines Cadets (SCC) are part of the Sea Cadets, a United Kingdom uniformed youth organization was formed in 1955 by the then Commandant General Royal Marines – General Sir Campbell Richard Hardy, KCB, CBE, DSO & Bar. It could be said that The Royal Marines Cadets are a hybrid between the all important cadet experience and benefits of a Sea Cadet and that of an Army Cadet, but it is so much more than that. It is a unique opportunity to learn and develop personal skills and attributes in leadership, teamwork and self-discipline.  They take part in all the waterborne activities, as well as branching off into adventure training and military skills too. The Royal Marines Cadets of the SCC specialise in activities such as orienteering, fieldcraft, and weapon handling.

There are also the smaller Combined Cadet Force (RM CCF) and Royal Marines Cadets of the Volunteer Cadet Corps (RM VCC) this article deals only with the Royal Marines Cadets of the Sea Cadet Corps RM SCC).

History 
The Royal Marines Cadets of the Sea Cadet Corps were formed in 1955 as the Marine Cadet Section, after the then incoming Commandant General Royal Marines, General Sir Campbell Richard Hardy, KCB, CBE, DSO & Bar, expressed a wish to form a Marine Cadet Section which would be incorporated into the Sea Cadet Corps

In 2010 the Marine Cadet Section was renamed Royal Marines Cadets by Her Majesty Queen Elizabeth II patron of the Sea Cadet Corps, following an agreement the Admiralty Board to allow the use of "Royal" in their title. An official rebadging ceremony took place at CTCRM Lympstone on 25 September 2011 including the Volunteer Cadet Corps and Combined Cadet Force.

The Royal Marines Cadets of the SCC, CCF and VCC were inspected together on parade in 2014 by the late Duke of Edinburgh, in his capacity as Captain General Royal Marines to mark the 350th anniversary of the Royal Marines. at Buckingham Palace

In October 2019, at the National Trafalgar Day Parade, a new Corps March for the Royal Marines Cadets was first publicly performed. The March was written by the Royal Marines Band Service, and is called "Dignus" ("Be Worthy").

Organisation 
Royal Marines Cadets (SCC) are a sub-branch of the Sea Cadet Corps which created in 1955 on command of the Captain General Royal Marines and the Commandant General Royal Marines to be a Detachment of the Sea Cadet Corps, similar to the structure of the Royal Marines as part of the Royal Navy. The exception is Chatham Royal Marines Cadet Unit (formally RM VCC) which was established in 1903. The first Marine Cadet Detachment was opened in Bristol Adventure Unit. Marine Cadets was formed for "...sturdy, adventurous boys..." Sea Cadet Units may open a Royal Marines Cadets Detachment, who will use the same facilities, parade alongside Sea Cadets and fall under the command of the unit CO. Royal Marines Cadet Detachments wear the uniform of the Royal Marines with the exception of Commando qualification badges, and wear cadet specific insignia. They follow a much more land-based training programme, with emphasis on subjects such as Weapons Handling, Military Map Reading and Fieldcraft and low level tactics.

Cadets or Cadet Force Adult Volunteers (CFAVs) wear the Royal Marines blue beret, with red tombstone patch behind the cap badge. RMC CFAVs who have completed either Royal Marines Commando training or the All Arms Commando Course at CTCRM Lympstone, are entitled to wear the Commando Green Beret, subject to written permission from the SRMO. Few Detachments are Male only due to staffing limitations, however, the majority also take female Royal Marines Cadets who make up 30% of the total complement of numbers.  As of 6 July 2014, following a tri-partite RMC parade at Buckingham Palace in the presence of the late Duke of Edinburgh, in his capacity as Captain General Royal Marines and in celebration of the 350th anniversary of the formation of the Royal Marines, all RM Cadets from the CCF, SCC, RMVCC can be titled as His Majesty's Royal Marines Cadets. Prior to this, the SCC used the title 'Marine Cadets'.

The Royal Marines Cadets of the SCC, CCF and VCC of over seen by the Royal Marines Cadet Council which meet every six months. The RMC Council is led by the Colonel Commandant Royal Marines Cadets – Brigadier Ged Salzano. All the 'flavours' of RM Cadets (SCC/CCF/VCC) are represented along with the RM Corps Secretariat, RM Corps Colonel, RMA, RMBS, Corps RSM, RMR RSM, CGRM Office.

ORBAT

National/HQ Level 
The operational head of the RM Cadets (SCC) is the Royal Marines Cadets Senior Staff Officer (RMCSSO) who is aided by Support Company Royal Marines Cadets and the Staff Royal Marines Officer (SRMO), who is a serving Royal Marines Warrant Officer or Colour Sergeant on secondment to the SCC as a Training Support Adviser. They are all responsible for overseeing the running of the RMC and reporting to the CSC.

Company/Area Level 
Companies cover the same area as the Sea Cadet "Area", and each is identified by a phonetic letter.

 ALPHA Company – South West Area 
 BRAVO Company – North West Area 
 LIMA Company – London Area 
 XRAY Company – Eastern Area 
 YANKEE Company – Northern Area 
 ZULU Company – Southern Area 
 Support Company – National

Each company has a Company Commander (usually a Major (SCC) RMR and forms a Company HQ.
 Company Second in Command (2IC) – an organisation of the coy and officer development
 Company Sergeant Major (CSM)
 Troop Commanders
 Company Training Officer
 Company Drill Leader
 Company Medic
 Company Quartermaster – Organises Company Stores
 Company Quartermaster Sergeant (CQMS) – Assists the Quartermaster

Troop/Local Level 
Since not every SCC Unit has a Royal Marines Cadet Detachment, using Sea Cadet Districts would result in Troops with one Detachment or none. As such, Troop borders, are independent and cross District boundaries. There are several Troops in a Company and are numbered 1 Troop, 2 Troop etc. Each Troop has a Troop Commander and Troop Sergeant. The Troop Commander and Troop Sergeant organise Troop level training and are primarily responsible for the standard of the Detachments in their designated area.

Detachment level 
Part of a Sea Cadet Unit and usually consist of a minimum of eight cadets (the Detachment can grow as big as there are sufficient CFAVs to facilitate the training) and is Commanded by a Detachment Commander.

Royal Marines Cadet Training 
During the COVID Pandemic the Cadet and CFAV syllabuses have been rewritten and modernised to reflect a modern Royal Marines and Royal Marines Cadets. The key benefits of becoming a Royal Marines Cadet are held within their training programme. The programme ensure that all cadets have the opportunity to develop and improve their:

 Leadership  
 Esprit de Corps  
 Teamwork & Team Spirit  
 Discipline  
 Communication  
 Interpersonal Skills  
 Initiative  
 Resourcefulness  
 Corps Values 
 The Commando Values and Spirit  
 Excellence  
 Integrity 
 Self-Discipline 
 Humility 
 Courage 
 Determination 
 Unselfishness 
 Cheerfulness

CATSEA 
CATSEA stands for Company Annual Training & Safety Efficiency Assessment. As outlined above, this is a compulsory annual event used to assess the efficiency of all Detachments on a National basis. It takes place over a weekend, and detachments are judged by the RMCSSO and their team. Detachments who fail to attend or are consistently graded as 'critical' (two or more years in succession) may be closed. Efficiency awards can also be awarded for merit.  

A CATSEA is broken down into three phases:

 Phase One – Company Appraisal

 Phase Two – Troop / Detachment Staff Appraisal

 Phase Three – Detachment Appraisal

The primary aim of the CATSEA is to ensure that a Safe System of Training (SST) is in place as per the relevant guidance and PAMs (Ranges, Chapter 1, Section 1; and Cadet Training Volume 6, Fieldcraft and Tactics, Introduction, Safety Precautions paragraphs 8–11). In addition, strategy, co-ordination and administration, adult development, the RMC experience and RMC ethos are assessed.  
Phase One assesses a company's planning and delivery of a weekend's activity (day and night) in the field. They will be expected to deliver training exercises (stances) through other instructors present, including at least one blank firing stance, and will be assessed on:  

Phase One assesses a company's planning and delivery of a weekend's activity (day and night) in the field. They will be expected to deliver training exercises (stances) through other instructors present, including at least one blank firing stance, and will be assessed on:  

 Prior administration, briefing and management of the event 
 Leadership and management of the event on the ground
 Compliance in terms of cadet and adult lists, permission forms and medical information, and correct paperwork for the movement and management of weapons and ammunition (as outlined in ASCR 16) 
Phase Two assesses Section (Troop) Commanders and Detachment instructors, who carry out aspects of the training stances. Section Commanders will be expected to deliver orders prior to the blank firing stance, and will be assessed on the orders process. All instructors will be given a task to complete within the weekend, and Detachment instructors will be assessed on their lesson preparation and delivery when running other stances.  

Phase Two assesses Section (Troop) Commanders and Detachment instructors, who carry out aspects of the training stances. Section Commanders will be expected to deliver orders prior to the blank firing stance, and will be assessed on the orders process. All instructors will be given a task to complete within the weekend, and Detachment instructors will be assessed on their lesson preparation and delivery when running other stances.  

Phase Three is a Detachment Appraisal. All cadets from each Detachment will participate in the stances and battle exercises; these will be assessed, along with the numbers of qualified instructors within the Detachment, and their delivery of their given tasks (Phase Two).  

CATSEA is an assessment event, however it is also a valuable training event for cadets. They are actively engaged throughout with practical activity in Skill at Arms and Fieldcraft. Cadets who complete outstanding aspects of the syllabus for their rank during CATSEA can be awarded the relevant modules.

MOD Indemnity 
Provided Sea Cadet Headquarters has approved the formation of a RMCD, they will be included in the MOD Indemnity, meaning that the unit is able to use Ministry of Defence (MoD) property and equipment, including boats, for RMC when compliant with Sea Cadet Regulations, policies and procedures, and Field Training Planning Procedures, including Training Afloat Regulations and Safety (TARS) and Inshore Boating Operating Standards (IBOS).

Gibraltar Cup Competition 
The Gibraltar Cup was presented by then Commandant General Royal Marines General Sir Campbell Richard Hardy, KCB, CBE, DSO & Bar. and named from the Battle Honour of that Corps.  It is awarded annually to the Royal Marines Cadet Detachment (RMCD) of the SCC which is considered to have attained the highest standard of all-round merit in the previous year.

The aim of the Gibraltar Cup Competition is for the best detachment in each Company to compete for the top award for the Royal Marines Cadets of the Sea Cadet Corps.  It is held in March (annually) at the Commando Training Centre Royal Marines (CTCRM), Lympstone, Devon.

The Gibraltar Cup Competition comprises a series of challenges, tests and assessments to enable the SRMO to establish which detachment will be the worthy winners of the Gibraltar Cup.  While each detachment already nominated is a worthy winner from within its own Company, only a fit, dedicated, well trained and cohesive detachment will take the trophy.

Current Holder: Caterham Detachment (ZULU Company, Southern Area)
Competition Date: Annually March/April

The next competition is planned for March 2023

Ranks

Cadets 
Royal Marines Cadets of the SCC are primarily trained in their Detachment formations. Whilst working through the syllabus, Royal Marines Cadets have many opportunities to participate in training with their Sea Cadet counterparts, as well as courses at Troop, Company and National level. Royal Marines Cadet to Cadet Lance Corporal Promotion Boards are convened at company level, as are Cadet Lance Corporal to Cadet Corporal boards are at company level, and Cadet Corporal to Cadet Sergeant Promotion Boards are convened at a National level by Support Company. All Promotion Boards consist of multiple skills sections, all of which must be passed individually.

Until November 2018 the rank of Marine Cadet was split into Marine Cadet Second Class (MC2) and Marine Cadet First Class (MC1), the latter being indicated by a white horizontal stripe on a blank rank slide. This was an honorary rank and was not needed for progression up to Cadet Lance Corporal. MC1 and MC2 have since been discontinued by the Royal Marines Cadets.

CFAV Senior NCOs and Warrant Officers

CFAV Officers

See also

Other Royal Marine Cadets 
 Royal Marines Volunteer Cadet Corps
 Royal Marines Section Combined Cadet Force

Other elements of the Community Cadet Forces 
 Army Cadet Force
 Air Training Corps
 Sea Cadets

Other MoD Sponsored Cadet Forces 
 Combined Cadet Force
 Volunteer Cadet Corps

Related articles 
 Reserve Forces and Cadets Association
 Cadet Vocational Qualification Organisation (CVQO)
 Marine Society and Sea Cadets
 National Association of Training Corps for Girls
 Young Marines – American equivalent

Notes

References 

1955 establishments in the United Kingdom
British Cadet organisations
Royal Marines
Youth organisations based in the United Kingdom